Daphnandra tenuipes, commonly known as the socket sassafrass, or red-flowered socketwood is a rainforest tree in eastern Australia. It grows on the more fertile basaltic and alluvial soils. Found from near Boorganna Nature Reserve near Taree, New South Wales to just over the border into Queensland at Springbrook National Park. It is a small to medium-sized tree featuring red new shoots and red flowers.

Daphnandra tenuipes was first described by J.R. Perkins in 1901, and still bears its original name.

References

Atherospermataceae
Trees of Australia
Flora of New South Wales
Flora of Queensland